is a woodblock print by the Japanese ukiyo-e artist Hokusai. 

The image is considered one of the masterpieces of the series, particularly in its early blue impression (aizuri-e).

Standing precariously upon a rocky outcrop, a man casts his net onto the violent Fuji River at Kajikazawa. Man and nature appear fused into one: The picture is full of movement, his tensed body mimics the motion of the waves below, and this curved shape is reflected in the rock on which he stands. The triangular shape made by the fishing lines also echoes that of Mount Fuji which is seen rising above.

The first impression employs the aizuri technique while later versions add different colours. The fisherman and son gain a red jacket, while the rocks are coloured with a gradated (bokashi) green-to-yellow wash. Some impressions add a streak of pink to the sky.

References 

 
Works by Hokusai
Mount Fuji